Maryland gained 1 seat in reapportionment after the 1800 census. Rather than increasing the number of districts, however, Maryland made the  a plural district with 2 seats.

See also 
 United States House of Representatives elections, 1802 and 1803
 List of United States representatives from Maryland
 Maryland's 2nd congressional district special election, 1802

Notes 

1803
Maryland
United States House of Representatives